Murder Unveiled is a 2005 Canadian television film. The movie is based on the true story of the Jaswinder Kaur Sidhu murder.  The film was screened at the Asian Festival of First Films on November 26, 2005 and was first aired on CBC on February 6, 2006.

Plot
In India, a young woman is kidnapped, and her young male companion beaten within an inch of his life. He is working class Sikh, Surinder Singh; she is his wife, the former Davinder Samra, a Canadian Sikh whom he met when she visited India a year earlier for her cousin's wedding. For both, it was love at first sight. However, Davinder comes from a traditional Sikh family, who made their fortune in Canada. Her parents, who knew nothing of Surinder when Surinder and Davinder eloped, were seeking a suitable husband for her. As the story unfolds leading to the kidnapping/beating and the subsequent investigation by the local police and Crime Investigation Division, the power of money and of Sikh family honor is shown.

Cast
Anita Majumdar as Davinder Samra
Chenier Hundal	as Surinder Singh
Hassani Shapi as Jaipal
Lushin Dubey a Kuldeep Samra
Sanjay Talwar as Inspector Darshan Singh
Vinay Pathak as Inspector Gurpal Badash
Cedric De Souza as Mohan
Vik Sahay as Bindri
Michael Benyaer as Ashu
Zena Darawalla as Jasminder
Parm Soor as Vikram Samra
Veena Sood as Magistrate
Tony Ali as Doctor
Sooraj Jaswal as Jaggi
Rajinder Singh Cheema as Suitor's #2 Father
Balinder Johal as Suitor's #2 Mother
Stephen Park as Immigration Officer
Bill MacDonald	as Business Man #1
Jim Francis as Senior Immigration Officer
Manoj Sood as Lawyer
Vir Singh Pannu as Jhagi
Gurpreet Singh Sekhon as Ashu's Thug
Tegan Moss as Veronica
Jag Cheema as Suitor #3
Jai Sondhi as Parmveer
Tara Gerewal as Amarjeet
Taminder S. Singh as Dharamleen
Nina Tiwana as Grandmother
Paya Choudhry as Surinda's Mother
Kamal Tiwari as Nirmal Bakshi
Mylène Dinh-Robic as Host
George Gordon as Judge
Sanjay Madhav as Vic Prasad
Dev Parmar as Prisoner

Awards
 2005 Best Actress Award at the 2005 Asian Festival of First Films: Anita Majumdar
 2006 Gemini Award for Best Performance by an Actress in a Featured Supporting Role in a Dramatic Program or Miniseries: Lushin Dubey

References

External links

2006 television films
2006 films
CBC Television original films
English-language Canadian films
Films shot in British Columbia
Films shot in India
Television series by Force Four Entertainment
Films directed by Vic Sarin
Canadian drama television films
2000s English-language films
2000s Canadian films